Olivia "Livvy" Breen (born 26 July 1996) is a Welsh Paralympian athlete, who competes for Wales and Great Britain mainly in T38 sprint and F38 long jump events. She qualified for the 2012 Summer Paralympics and was selected for the T38 100m and 200m sprint and was also part of the T35-38 women's relay team. She has also represented Wales at the 2014, 2018 and 2022 Commonwealth Games winning gold in the F38 Long Jump in 2018 and gold in the T37/38 100m in 2022 .

Early life
Breen was born in England to a Welsh mother and Irish father. Breen, who has cerebral palsy, began racing while still at primary school.

Career
Breen was given her T38 classification in January 2012, allowing her to be brought into contention for Paralympic selection. In June 2012 she competed in the IPC Athletics European Championships in Stadskanaal in the Netherlands, winning the bronze in both the 100m and 200m sprints. She recorded a personal best in the 100m at the European championships, and followed this with a personal best in the 200m sprint at the Diamond League meet at Crystal Palace, London early in July. Her times resulted in a late call up to the Great Britain team for the 2012 Summer Paralympics. She was the youngest member of the Great Britain Paralympic athletics team during the 2012 Games.

Breen is coached by Aston Moore a long jump coach based in Loughborough.

2012 Paralympic Games in London
Breen competed in London in the T38 100m and 200m sprints, and the first leg of the T35-38 women's relay team.

100m: Breen came fifth in the 100m final with a time of 14.42. The winning time was posted by Margarita Goncharova at 13.45s.

200m: After qualifying as the second fastest runner up, Breen came in eighth in the 200m final with a time of 30.22s.

4 × 100 m relay: Breen (who ran the first leg of the relay final) won a bronze medal with teammates Jenny McLoughlin, Bethy Woodward and Katrina Hart with a time of 56.08s which was a season's best. The final baton change between Hart and McLoughlin was poor as a result of a bump from the Australian athlete in the next lane but the team was judged to have correctly handed the baton moments before the last team member exited the hand-over zone, while in the same race two opposing teams were disqualified, one being the Australian team.

2013 IPC World Championships in Lyon

Breen finished fifth in both the 100m and 200m in Lyon at the IPC World Championships.

2014

Breen switched from sprints to compete in the long jump for Wales at the Commonwealth Games finishing narrowly out of the medals in seventh place.

The teenager then went on to compete at the IPC European Championships where she won individual bronze in the 100m behind teammate Sophie Hahn and Russia's Margarita Goncharova just a few months after recording a new personal best over the distance – 13.47.

Breen then ran the second leg of the T35-38 relay team, which included Bethany Woodward, Sophie Hahn and Jenny McLoughlin. The team went on to win silver behind Russia in a new British record of 53.84.

2017

At the 2017 World Para Athletics Championships in London Breen secured a gold medal in the F38 Long Jump jumping a lifetime best of 4.81m. A few days later she came fourth in the T38 100m.

2020 Paralympic Games in Tokyo
Breen is part of the GBteam to compete at the postponed 2020 Summer Paralympics in Tokyo.

2022 Commonwealth Games in Birmingham
Breen took the gold medal in the Women's T38 100m Final in the 2022 Commonwealth Games in Birmingham.

References

External links
 

1996 births
Living people
Sportspeople from Guildford
Track and field athletes with cerebral palsy
Welsh people with disabilities
Welsh female sprinters
British female long jumpers
Paralympic athletes of Great Britain
Athletes (track and field) at the 2012 Summer Paralympics
Athletes (track and field) at the 2016 Summer Paralympics
Medalists at the 2012 Summer Paralympics
Commonwealth Games gold medallists for Wales
Commonwealth Games medallists in athletics
Athletes (track and field) at the 2014 Commonwealth Games
Athletes (track and field) at the 2018 Commonwealth Games
Paralympic bronze medalists for Great Britain
Welsh Paralympic competitors
Welsh people of Irish descent
World Para Athletics Championships winners
Medalists at the World Para Athletics European Championships
Paralympic medalists in athletics (track and field)
Athletes (track and field) at the 2020 Summer Paralympics
Athletes (track and field) at the 2022 Commonwealth Games
Medallists at the 2018 Commonwealth Games
Medallists at the 2022 Commonwealth Games